Empty Houses are Lonely is a 2006 compilation album by Tom Brosseau.

Album insight
Empty Houses are Lonely is composed of songs recorded from 2001-2003, including songs from North Dakota, an unreleased five song album called Five Song Demo, which received much attention on KCRW and lead to Brosseau's performance on Morning Becomes Eclectic with Nic Harcourt in 2003, and Late Night at Largo, as well as previously unreleased songs.

The album artwork is a collaboration between Brosseau, who provided the original tilting design, and graphics designer, DLT. A photo used in the liner notes was taken backstage at the Iron Horse Music Hall in Northampton, Massachusetts by American photographer Victoria Uhl in 2004.

Blurb from Fat Cat Records: "It was on Doug Schulkind's WFMU radio show Give The Drummer Some that we first came to hear the gentle acoustic sound of Tom Brosseau's music. A natural songwriting talent coming from such disparate influences as Nick Drake, Cole Porter, and Woody Guthrie, Tom sings songs of lost love and poetic observation that shimmer like aural tintypes. Ostensibly a collection of highlights from his recorded history to date, augmented by several new recordings, Empty Houses Are Lonely works as a fine introduction to Tom's plaintive, eloquent, timeless music."

Track listing
"Fragile Mind"
"Empty Houses are Lonely"
"Hurt to Try"
"Mary Anne"
"Dark Garage"
"Heart of Mine"
"The Broken Ukulele"
"How to Grow a Woman from the Ground"
"Lonesome Valley"
"Bars"

Personnel
 Tom Brosseau: Vocal, acoustic and electric guitar, harmonica
 Gregory Page: Bass, additional guitars on track 3; Drums and bass on track 5; Pump organ on track 6
 Brian Cantrell: Drums on track 3
 Cindy Wasserman: Vocals on tracks 3 and  7
 Wes Tudor: Cello on track 6

References

Tom Brosseau albums
2006 compilation albums
FatCat Records compilation albums